Pompeia is the name of several ancient Roman women.

Pompeia may also refer to:
Pompeia gens, an ancient Roman family
Pompeia, São Paulo, a municipality in Brazil
Pompeia, an 1889 recreation of a structure from ancient Pompeii
Núria Pompeia (1931–2016), Spanish cartoonist and journalist
Raul Pompeia (1863–1895), Brazilian writer

See also
Pompeius
Pompeius (disambiguation)